Albert Safaryan (born August 1, 1963), is an Armenian actor. He is an honored artist of Armenia since 2013.

External links

References

1963 births
Living people
Armenian male film actors
21st-century Armenian male actors
20th-century Armenian male actors
Actors from Tbilisi
Georgian people of Armenian descent
Honored artists of Armenia